MOK Mursa Osijek is a Croatian men's volleyball club based in Osijek, Croatia. It was established in 2002.  

It plays in the Croatian 1A Volleyball League.

MOK Mursa plays domestic matches at small hall of Gradski vrt Hall. Small hall has a capacity of 1,448 attendants.

Honours 

Croatian Volleyball Cup: 1
2011

Croatian volleyball clubs
Sport in Osijek